Hezbollah social services are social development programs organized by the Lebanese paramilitary group, Hezbollah. Hezbollah's popularity among the Lebanese Shiite population, historically one of the poorest communities in Lebanon, comes partly from the social services it provides. Social services have a central role in the party's programs, closely linked to its military and politico-religious functions.  

Most experts believe that Hezbollah's social and health programs are worth hundreds of millions of dollars annually. The American think tank Council on Foreign Relations also said that Hezbollah "is a major provider of social services, operating schools, hospitals, and agricultural services for thousands of Lebanese Shiites." The expansiveness of these services has helped Hezbollah remain deeply embedded in Lebanese society.

Summary 
Hezbollah organizes an extensive social development program and runs hospitals, news services, educational facilities, and encouragement of Nikah mut‘ah. Some of its established institutions are: Emdad committee for Islamic Charity, Hezbollah Central Press Office, Al Jarha Association, and Jihad Al Binaa Developmental Association. Jihad Al Binna's Reconstruction Campaign is responsible for numerous economic and infrastructure development projects in Lebanon. Hezbollah has set up a Martyr's Institute (Al-Shahid Social Association), which guarantees to provide living and education expenses for the families of fighters who die in battle.

In March 2006, an IRIN news report of the UN Office for the Coordination of Humanitarian Affairs noted:

"Hezbollah not only has armed and political wings - it also boasts an extensive social development program. Hezbollah currently operates at least four hospitals, twelve clinics, twelve schools and two agricultural centres that provide farmers with technical assistance and training. It also has an environmental department and an extensive social assistance program. Medical care is also cheaper than in most of the country's private hospitals and free for Hezbollah members".

According to CNN: "Hezbollah did everything that a government should do, from collecting the garbage to running hospitals and repairing schools."

In July 2006, during the war with Israel, when there was no running water in Beirut, Hezbollah was arranging supplies around the city. "People here [in South Beirut] see Hezbollah as a political movement and a social service provider as much as it is a militia, in this traditionally poor and dispossessed Shiite community." Also, after the war it competed with the Lebanese government to reconstruct destroyed areas. According to analysts like American University Professor Judith Palmer Harik, Jihad al-Binaa has won the initial battle of hearts and minds, in large part because they are the most experienced in Lebanon in the field of reconstruction.

In 2021 Iranian fuel was exported to Lebanon by Hezbollah. Nasrallah claimed in his speech that the fuel will first be donated to institutions like orphanages, public hospitals, water stations, nursing homes, and the Lebanese Red Cross.
After the 2023 Turkey–Syria earthquake Hezbollah sent humanitarian aid the Syria.

References

Hezbollah
Society of Lebanon